Addhi Khuyi (Addhi meaning "half" and Khuyi meaning a "well" ) is a place which lies almost in the center of Nakodar & Nurmahal. Its name itself suggests that its in the midpoint of both cities. It is also the stopping point for the villages Nawa Pind Shonkia Da, Sidhwan & Littran. It most certainly has derived its name from a very old well which is placed nearby. Addhi Khuyi is a very famous landmark in the central Punjab area.

Villages in Jalandhar district